Roger Nash BA, MA, PhD (Exon) is a Canadian philosopher and poet.  He was born in Maidenhead, Berkshire, England on 3 November 1942. He grew up in England, Egypt, Cyprus, Singapore and Hong Kong. He has a B.A. from the University of Wales (1965), an M.A. from McMaster University (1966) and a Ph.D. from the University of Exeter (1974).

Roger Nash is a professor Emeritus in the Department of Philosophy at Laurentian University in Sudbury, Ontario. He has served as Chair of the Department of Philosophy, and Director of the Interdisciplinary Humanities M.A. programme in "Interpretation and Value" at Laurentian University, and was a founding member of the Graduate Diploma in Science Communication offered by Laurentian University and Science North. His main philosophical interests are: Ancient Greek Philosophy, Asian Philosophy, Wittgenstein, and Environmental Ethics.

He is currently Poet Laureate of the City of Greater Sudbury (population 160,000), appointed by the Mayor and Council .  He was president of the League of Canadian Poets from 1998 to 2000. During his tenure as president, he worked with Senator Jerry Grafstein to help create the position of Canadian Poet Laureate.

He is a cantor at the Shaar Hashomayim Synagogue, and is active in community fund-raising. He is married to Bronwen Christine and has two children, Piers Nash (born 1969) and Caedmon Nash (born 1970).

Awards
 Prism International Poetry Contest, first prize, 1985/86.
 The Fiddlehead Writing Contest, first prize, poetry, 1993–94.
 Canadian Jewish Book Award, Poetry, 1997.
 Confederation Poets Award, Arc Magazine, 1997 for Circumstantial Evidence of the Visitation of Angels.
 PEN/O.Henry Short Story Prize finalist for "The Camera and the Cobra," anthologized in the PEN/O.Henry Prize Stories 2009 (Anchor Books, New York, 2009).
 Professor Emeritus, Laurentian University, 2009.
 First Poet Laureate of the City of Greater Sudbury, appointed by Mayor and Council, 2010.

Bibliography

Books
 Upsidoon, Your Schrivner Press (2014)
 The Camera and the Cobra, Your Schrivner Press (2012)
 Sound of Sunlight, Buschekbooks, (2012)
 Something Blue and Flying Upward: New and Selected Poems Your Scrivener Press (2006) 
 The Poetry of Prayer, 2nd, expanded edition, Harleston, UK: Edgeways Books, 2004
 Once I was a Wheelbarrow, Calgary, AB: Bayeux Arts, 2000, 86p. 
 Licking Honey Off A Thorn. North Bay: League of Canadian Poets and Catchfire Press, 48p. 1998
 Northern Prospects: An Anthology of Northeastern Ontario Poetry. Sudbury: Your Scrivener Press, 1998, 120 pp. 
 Spring-Fever. Sudbury/Toronto: Your Scrivener Press/ League of Canadian Poets, 42p. 1997
 Uncivilizing. Toronto: Insomniac Press, 1997, 125p. Nash, R., Davidson, C. Dunn, S,. Lever, B. Reaney, J. and Sward, R.
 In the Kosher Chow Mein Restaurant. Sudbury, ON: Your Scrivener Press, 1996. 
 The Poetry of Prayer. Norfolk, EN: Brynmill Press. 60p., 1994.
 Ethics, Science, Technology and the Environment: A Reader. Athabasca University Press, 1993.
 Ethics, Science, Technology and the Environment: A Study Guide. Athabasca University Press, 1993.
 Night Flying. Fredericton: Fiddlehead Poetry Books—Goose Lane Editions, 83p., 1990
 Psalms From The Suburbs. Kingston: Quarry Press, 73p., 1986
 Settlement In A School of Whales. Fredericton: Fiddlehead Poetry Books, 55p., 1983

Chapters
"Strategies: how to get written by a poem." In Poets in the classroom. Ed. by Betsy Struthers and Sarah Klassen. Markham, ON: Pembroke Publishers Limited, 81–87. 1995.

Articles
 Co-authored with B. C. Nash, "Helping Young Children Express Their Feelings", Journal of the Canadian Association for Young Children, Vol. 4:1, 1977, pp. 37–42.  Reprinted in Principals' And Administrators' Guide to Kindergarten, O.I.S.E. Press, 1979.
 "Dickie: Defining Art and Falsifying Dada", The Journal of Aesthetic Education, Vol. 15, July 1981, pp. 107–111.
 Abstract of "Dickie: Defining Art and Falsifying Dada", in The Philosopher's Index.  Also stored in Dialog (Computerised Information Retrieval System).
 "Education In The Critical Viewing of Modern Art", Teacher Education, No. 19, 1981, pp. 63–72.
 Abstract of "Art Education:  Children's Concepts of Actively Experiencing Art, And Of The Artist As Communicating With Them", Reporting Classroom Research, Vol. 11:2, 1982, pp. 4–5 (publication of the Ontario Educational Research Council).* "God and Beauty", The Gadfly: A Quarterly Review Of English Letters, Vol. 6, No. 4, November 1983, pp. 9–20.
 "The Poem's Creation Of Its Readers", Quarry, Vol. 32, No. 4, Autumn 1983, special issue on Creative Reflections, pp. 81–82.
 "The Education of Feeling and Emotion", review article, Interchange: A Quarterly Review of Education, Vol. 15, No. 3, 1984, pp. 72–76.
 "How to Get Written by a Poem: Questions Students Ask a Poet", Orbit: Ideas About Teaching and Learning, Vol. 16, No. 2, 1985, pp. 10–11.
 "The Psalms:  Prayer that Poetry Helps Make", Gadfly: A Quarterly Review of English Letters, Vol. 8, No. 2, 1985, pp. 10–23.
 "The Reader as Co-Creator of a Poem:  Implications for Classroom Practice", Teacher Education, No. 27, 1985, pp. 15–33.
 "The Demonology of Verse", Philosophical Investigations, Vol. 10, No. 4, 1987, pp. 299–316.
 "Learning Old English:  Voices from the Birth of Our Language", Orbit, Vol. 18, No. 4, 1987, pp. 18–19.
 "Meeting the First English Poets:  Art as a Step into Literature", Orbit, Vol. 19, No. 1, 1988, pp. 20–21.
 "The Shepherd Psalm:  A Shepherd in Need", Wesley Cragg, Laurent Larouche, Gertrud Lewis (eds), Challenging the Conventional, Burlington:  Trinity Press, 1989, pp. 216–225.
 "Sacraments of the Small and Simple", review article, Quarry, Vol. 38, No. 3, 1989, pp. 102–105
 "Adam's Place in Nature:  Respect or Domination?", Journal of Agricultural Ethics (now called Journal of Environmental and Agricultural Ethics), Vol. 3, No. 2, 1990, pp. 102–113
 "Poetry, Paradox and Gender", review article, Quarry, Vol. 39, No. 4, 1990, pp. 98–100.
 "Poetry, Mysticism and the Indirectness of God", review article, Quarry, Vol. 41, No. 1, 1991, pp. 105–106.
 "Strategies: How To Get Written By A Poem", in Betsy Struthers, Sarah Klassen (eds), Poets in the Classroom (League of Canadian Poets), Markham, Ont.: Pembroke Publishers Limited, 1995, pp. 81–87
 "The Tea Ceremony: To Travel Is To Arrive", Koyomizu: Toronto Urasenke Tea Ceremony Society News, No. 6, 1997, p. 2
 "The Tea Ceremony: Deepening a Sense of Beauty", Koyomizu: Toronto Urasenke Tea Ceremony Society News, No. 6, 1997, p. 3
 "Poetry and justice", League of Canadian Poets Newsletter, President's column, June 1998, p. 1
 "The world is made up of poems, not atoms", League of Canadian Poets Newsletter, President's column, September 1998, p. 1
 "League initiatives", League of Canadian Poets Newsletter, President's column, November 1998, p. 2
 "Performing from the soles of your feet", League of Canadian Poets Newsletter, President's column, January 1999, No. 132, p. 1.
 "Poetry against professors", League of Canadian Poets Newsletter, President's column, March 1999, No. 133, pp. 1–2
 "Kosovo and poetry", League of Canadian Poets Newsletter, President's column, May 1999, No. 134, pp. 1–2.
 "A Parliamentary Poet Laureate; and Should We Define Poetry?", League of Canadian Poets Newsletter, President's column, November 1999, pp. 1–2
 "Eye Problems and the Waters of Life" (essay on literary friendships), Web Del Sol. Mike Neff ed., Robert Sward guest ed.
 "Ottawa Needs Poetry", Northern Life, 22 December 1999, p. 17
 "Poetry at the Millennium", League of Canadian Poets Newsletter, President's column, January 2000, pp. 1–2
 "See you later, Al" (tribute to Al Purdy), Northern Life, 28 April 2000, p. 8
 "‘Peace/Shalom’ in the Jewish Tradition", featured article, Outlook, Vol. 40, No. 5, Sept./Oct. 2002, 40th Anniversary edition, pp. 5 – 6
 "A Flurry of Hammers: Waging Peace through Poetry – Is it Possible?", in Susan McMaster (ed.), Waging Peace: Poetry and Political Action, Ottawa: Penumbra Press, 2002, pp. 129 – 131
 "Creation, Wonder and the Poetry of Job", in Melchior Mbonimpa et al. (eds), Mysticism: Select Essays, Sudbury: Editions Glopro, 2002, pp. 70–88
 Presentation on proposed Poet Laureate Bill, Proceedings of the Standing Senate Committee on Social Affairs, Science and Technology, reprinted from Hansard: Debates of Senate in John Metcalf (ed.), Canadian Notes and Queries: The Making of the Parliamentary Poet Laureate, No. 62, 2002, pp. 19–20
 "Thales and the Beginnings of Science: Bridging the ‘Two Cultures’ Divide", Canadian Chemical News, pp. 10–11, March 2004

Published Conference Papers
"Collaboration in curriculum committees and the culture of the university: a clash of perspectives?" In Proceedings of the 15th Annual Conference of Teaching and Learning in Higher Education, 37. 1995.

Short Stories
 "Banking by mirrors", Queen's Quarterly, Vol. 94, No. 2, 1987, pp. 303–308.
 "The Choirmaster", Featured fiction, Cross-Canada Writers' Magazine,   Vol. 111, No. 2, 1989, pp. 15, 28–29.
 "A Conspiracy of Grandmothers", Wascana Review, Vol. 25, No. 1, 1990, pp. 32–36.
 "The Banjo Case", Dalhousie Review, Vol. 72, No. 3, 1992, pp. 362–367
 "The Choirmaster", reprinted in L. Steven (ed.) Bluffs: Northeastern Stories from the Edge, Your Scrivener Press, 2006, pp. 102–113
 "The Camera and the Cobra", Grain Vol. 35, No. 2, Autumn 2007, pp. 24–31
 "Houses that Look for their Keys", Wascana Review, Vol 20, Nos. 1–2, Spring/Fall 2005, pp. 33–40 (late publication)
 "Growing Up under a Table", The Nashwaak Review, Vol. 20/21, No. 1, Spring/Summer2008, pp. 88–96
 "The Camera and the Cobra", anthologized in The PEN/O.Henry Prize Stories 2009, Anchor Books – Random House, 2009, pp. 160–169
 "The Writers on their Work", The PEN/O.Henry Prize Stories 2009, pp. 399–401
 "The House of the Fish Head Soup", Sudbury Living, Fall 2009, pp. 66–68

Poems
 "Two poems about nothing", The Fiddlehead, Winter 1980, No. 124, p. 96.
 "Settlement in a school of whales", Quarry, 31:4, 1982, pp. 37–38.
 "Sermon of a cricket in an empty bucket", Quarry, 31:4, 1982, p. 39.
 "Commandments of an old man in the park", Antigonish Review, No. 45, Spring 1981, pp. 91–92.
 "Sulphur cloud", Antigonish Review, No. 45, Spring 1981, p. 90.
 "Two prairie sky poems", Wascana Review, 15:2, 1980, pp. 42–43.
 "The rocks eat breakfast", Fiddlehead, No. 130, 1981, p. 17.
 "Poems as the first rivers", Fiddlehead, No. 130, 1981, p. 16.
 "Stella Almeida reads her shopping list", Quarry, 31:1, 1982, p. 15.
 "What a warm night tonight", Antigonish Review, No. 49, 1982, p. 41.
 "The lake that became a hawk", Antigonish Review, No. 49, 1982, p. 40.
 "Tree storms", Canadian Author and Bookman, 57:2, 1982, p. 18.
 "A poem as a question", Canadian Author and Bookman, 57:3, 1982, p. 24.
 "Bath time in Don Mills", Contemporary Verse Two, 6:4, 1982, p. 15.
 "One girl on a bicycle balances a town", Fiddlehead, No. 133, 1982, p. 77.
 "Eight ways of spending an evening on Whitsun Lake", Fiddlehead, No. 133, 1982, p. 75.
 "Elevators", Fiddlehead, No. 133, 1982, p. 76.
 "Pretzels", The Gadfly: A Quarterly Review of English Letters, 5:3, 1982, p. 10.
 "Snow rot", Germination, 6:2, 1982, p. 24.
 "The kite that flew a boy", Germination, 6:2, 1982, p. 25.
 "After thirty years of farming", Queen's Quarterly, 89:4, 1982, p. 783.
 "A fast wind blows", Queen's Quarterly, 89:4, 1982, p. 783.
 "The Bible barn", Queen's Quarterly, 89:4, 1982, p. 784.
 "Thirteenth floor please", Antigonish Review, No. 52, 1983, p. 52.
 "Spring cookies", The Gadfly: A Quarterly Review of English Letters, Vol. 6, Nos. 2–3, May–August 1983, p. 42.
 "Chronicle of a poem's trek into new lands", The Gadfly: A Quarterly Review of English Letters, Vol. 6, Nos. 2–3, May–August 1983, pp. 42–44.
 "Backwards", The Gadfly: A Quarterly Review of English Letters, Vol. 6, Nos. 2–3, May–August 1983, p. 44.
 "Pukka pyjamas", The Gadfly: A Quarterly Review Of English Letters, Vol. 6, Nos. 2–3, May–August 1983, p. 45.
 "Greenwich heart time", The Gadfly: A Quarterly Review of English Letters, Vol. 6, Nos. 2–3, May–August 1983, p. 46.
 "Wolf call north of Timmins", Prism International, Vol. 22, No. 1, Fall 1983, p. 68.
 "A history of loons", Prism International, Vol. 22, No. 1, Fall 1983, p. 70.
 "Grandma's preserves", Prism International, Vol. 22, No. 1, Fall 1983, p. 69.
 "The mound of the Viking chocolate bars", West Coast Review, Vol. 18, No. 2, October 1983, pp. 43–44.
 "A dream's top headlines", West Coast Review, Vol. 18, No. 2, October 1983, p. 46.
 "Three ways of following snowshoe tracks", Antigonish Review, No. 55, Autumn 1983, p. 11.
 "Dry cantors", Antigonish Review, No. 55, Autumn 1983, p. 12.
 "Axe", Antigonish Review, No. 55, Autumn 1983, p. 12.
 "A poem's first remembered experience of a reader", Quarry, Vol. 32, No. 4, Autumn 1983, special issue on Creative Reflections, pp. 55–56.
 "An invasion of goats", Waves, Vol. 12, No. 4, Spring 1984, p. 57.
 "Gulls", Wascana Review, Vol. 18, No. 1, Spring 1984, pp. 54–55.
 "Elegy for a sailing man", Contemporary Verse Two, Vol. 8, No. 1, May 1984, p. 16.
 "Letter to a friend", Event: Journal of the Contemporary Arts, Vol. 13, No. 1, p. 95.
 "Several excuses for having stayed", Quarry, Vol. 33, No. 3, Summer 1984, p. 40.
 "After her stroke", Quarry, Vol. 33, No. 3, Summer 1984, pp. 40–42.
 "The hound on the hill", Gadfly: A Quarterly Review of English Letters, Vol. 7, Nos. 3–4, August–November, 1984, pp. 84–85.
 "Bomb sites", Gadfly: A Quarterly Review of English Letters, Vol. 7, Nos. 3–4, August–November, 1984, pp. 85–86.
 "Poem of Probabilities", Canadian Literature, No. 103, 1984, p. 26.
 "Women at Windows", Waves, Vol. 13, No. 4, 1985, p. 84.
 "Evening on a Half-Mile Lake", Malahat Review, No. 71, 1985, pp. 58–59.
 "The Ultramarine Bicep", Arc: A Magazine of Poetry and Poetry Criticism, No. 10, 1983, p. 46.
 "Spring Ponds", Arc, No. 10, 1983, p. 46.
 "Ice Eggs", Arc, No. 10, 1983, p. 47.
 "When Mirrors Run Dry", Arc, No. 10, 1983, p. 47.
 "Song of Ghengis the Cat", Arc, No. 10, 1983, p. 48.
 "The World's Last Poem", Antigonish Review, No. 60, 1985, p. 111.
 "C.N. Tower: Revolving Restaurant", Antigonish Review, No. 60, 1985, p. 112.
 "Letter to a Friend", reprinted and anthologized in Anthology of Magazine Verse And Yearbook Of American Poetry, ed. A.F. Pater, Monitor Books: Beverley Hills, 1985, pp. 333–334.
 "The Instinct of Hydrangeas", West Coast Review, Vol. 20, No. 2, 1985, p. 40.
 "The Sea Cliff of Summer", West Coast Review, Vol. 20, No. 2, 1985, p. 41.
 "Wolf Call North of Timmins", reprinted and anthologized in Prism International: Twenty-Five Years in Retrospect, edited by John Schoutsen and St. John Simmons, Vancouver: University of British Columbia Press, 1984, p. 196.
 "To My Wife of Twenty Years", American Poetry Anthology (American Poetry Association), ed. John Frost, Vol. 6, No. 1, 1986, p. 164.
 "Double Burial under Glass (Dorchester Museum)", Wascana Review, Vol. 20, No. 1, 1985, pp. 47–48.
 "Schubert's Lessons for Clarinet in an Old Trapper's Hut", Quarry, Vol. 35, No. 1, 1986, pp. 56–57.
 "Tree Felling", Gadfly, Vol. 8, No. 3, 1986, p. 22.
 "Night Flying", Prism International, Vol. 24, No. 4, 1986, pp. 7–8.
 "The Robberies", Prism International, Vol. 24, No. 4, 1986, p. 9.
 "The Sound of One Hand Clapping", Prism International, Vol. 24, No. 4, p. 10.
 "The Girl in the Rainbow Skirt", Words of Praise: A Treasury of Religious and Inspirational Poetry, Vol. 2 (American Poetry Association), ed. John Frost, 1986, p. 178.
 "Message transmitted from a distant constellation", Queen's Quarterly, Vol. 93, No. 2, Summer 1986, pp. 337–338.
 "Please write to me in this poem", The Malahat Review, No. 77, 1986, p. 77.
 "Uncle Lennie's third proof of the existence of a question", The Malahat Review, No. 77, 1986, p. 78.
 "The tea ceremony", Ariel: A Review of International English Literature, Vol. 18, No. 1, 1987, p. 16.
 "The world's last poem", reprinted in Wesley Cragg (ed.), Contemporary Moral Issues, 2nd ed., Toronto: McGraw-Hill Ryerson Ltd, 1987, p. 477.
 "Message transmitted from a distant constellation", reprinted in Wesley Cragg (ed.), Contemporary Moral Issues, 2nd ed., Toronto: McGraw-Hill Ryerson Ltd., 1987, pp. 550–551.
 "The Mandarin of Morning", Canadian Forum, Vol. 67, No. 768, 1987, p. 5.
 "Incident at London International Airport", Poetry Toronto, No. 134, 1987, pp. 18–19.
 "Lazarus raised in a canoe", Poetry Toronto, No. 134, 1987, p. 20.
 "Losing our shadows", Poetry Toronto, No. 134, 1987, p. 21.
 "Should I complain to the movers?", Poetry Toronto, No. 134, 1987, p. 22
 "Trial by ravens", Poetry Toronto, No. 134, 1987, p. 23
 "Deep-water fugue", Poetry Toronto, No. 134, 1987, pp. 24–25.
 "Lake herding", Poetry Toronto, No. 134, 1987, pp. 24–25.
 "Waiting and waiting for her in the park", West Coast Review, Vol. 21, No. 2, 1986, p. 38.
 "A rare gramophone recording", Prism International, Vol. 25, No. 4, 1987, p. 18.
 "The shaking", Prism International, Vol. 25, No. 4, 1987, p. 19.
 "One day", Prism International, Vol. 25, No. 4, 1987, p. 20.
 "Evening", Canadian Author and Bookman, Vol. 62, No. 4, 1987, p. 23.
 "This is my mother's camera", Canadian Literature, No. 113-114, 1987, p. 167.
 "Photo of an angry man", West Coast Review, Vol. 21, No. 3, 1987, p. 35.
 "A dream", West Coast Review, Vol. 21, No. 3, 1987, p. 36.
 "Cleaning the brasses", Wascana Review, Vol. 22, No. 1, 1987, pp. 65–66.
 "Voyages of a garden shed", Quarry, Vol. 36, No. 4, 1987, pp. 57–58.
 "The coppery weathercock", Antigonish Review, Nos. 69–70, 1987, p. 200.
 "Family discussion", Capilano Review, No. 45, 1988, p. 18.
 "Please write to me in this poem", in Mirror Images, edited by John McInnes, Scarborough:  Nelson Canada, 1988, p. 72.
 "One Day", Cragg et al. (eds), Challenging the Conventional, Burlington: Trinity Press, 1989, p. 71.
 "Cleaning the Brasses", ibid., p. 95.
 "Trying to Think of the Unthinkable", ibid., p. 167.
 "Night Thoughts", Malahat Review, No. 86, 1989, p. 91.
 "We Are All of Us Amazing to Be Here", Quarry, Vol. 30, No. 1, 1989, p. 28.
 "I Couldn't Count the Ways", Quarry, Vol. 30, No. 1, 1989, p. 29.
 "Trying to Think of the Unthinkable", Wascana Review, Vol. 23, No. 1, p. 32.
 "On Chagall's 'The Falling Angel'", Northward Journal, No. 46, 1989, p. 22.
 "On the Retirement of a Professor of English", MuseLetter, League of Canadian Poets, No. 70, 1989, pp. 20–21.
 "Betting on History", Dandelion, Vol. 16, No. 2, pp. 21–22.
 "Abstract Art", Dandelion, Vol. 16, No. 2, p. 23.
 "The Street of Gold", Dandelion, Vol. 16, No. 2, p. 24.
 "A Creation Story", The Antigonish Review, No. 79, 1989, p. 92.
 "Ageing Gracefully", The Antigonish Review, No. 79, 1989, p. 93.
 "Old Man in an Armchair", Malahat Review, No. 90, 1990. pp. 66–67.
 "On the Retirement of a Professor of English", reprinted in Museletter (League of Canadian Poets), No. 75, 1990, pp. 17–18.
 "The Appliances Delivery-Man", Event, Vol. 19, No. 1, 1990, p. 84.
 "Heavy Rain", Ariel: A Review of International English Literature, Vol. 21, No. 2, 1990, p. 91.
 "Maxims for Marriages", The Antigonish Review, Vol. 81–82, Spring-Summer 1990, p. 10.
 "Several excuses for having stayed", reprinted and anthologized in Roger Gower (ed.), Past into Present: An Anthology of British and American Literature, Harlow, UK: Longman, 1990, p. 456.
 "The University of Silence", anthologized in More Garden Varieties Two: An Anthology of Poetry, introduction by Patrick Lane, Stratford and Toronto: Mercury Press and the League of Canadian Poets, 1990, p. 82.
 "The House Burning", Canadian Author and Bookman, Vol. 66, No. 2, 1991, p. 13.
 "Geraniums", University of Windsor Review, Vol. 23, No. 2, p. 49, 1990.
 "At the Edges", University of Windsor Review, Vol. 23, No. 2, p. 50, 1990.
 "Vinnie", Canadian Literature, No. 128, p. 89, 1991.
 "The Artist as a Still Life", The Fiddlehead, No. 168, 1991, p. 76
 "Messengers", The Fiddlehead, No. 168, 1991, p. 77.
 "Means and ends", The Malahat Review, No. 97, p. 80, 1991.
 "Parting", The Malahat Review, No. 97, p. 81, 1991
 "Letter read in a storm", Ariel: A Review of International English Literature, Vol. 22, No. 3, 1991, p. 104.
 "Bell-ringing at evening", Ariel: A Review of International English Literature, Vol. 23, No. 2, 1992, p. 108.
 "Still life: iced water and an orange at Jericho", The Antigonish Review, No. 90, 1992, p. 136.
 "Heritage", Canadian Literature, No. 137, 1993., p. 7
 "A message from the Norns to the twenty-first century", Fiddlehead, No. 175, 1993, p. 31
 "The presence of absences", Malahat Review, No. 102, 1993, p. 99
 "Preparations for a journey", Malahat Review, No. 102, 1993, pp. 100–101
 "In the Kosher Chow Mein Restaurant", The Fiddlehead, No. 179, 1994, pp. 13–14
 "The Strong Wind", Wascana Review, Vol. 28, No. 2, p. 17, 1994
 "A Desperate Woman", Poetry Canada Review, Vol. 14, No. 4, 1994, p. 25
 "My Lady of Journeys", Poetry Canada Review, Vol. 14, No. 4, 1994, p. 25
 "Marriages of Opposites", Poetry Canada Review, Vol. 14, No. 4, 1994, p. 25
 "Where Our Voices Go", Poetry Canada Review, Vol. 14, No. 4, 1994, p. 25
 "The Word-Umbrella", Quarry, Vol. 43, No. 4, 1995, p. 128
 "Chicken-Plucking", Queen's Quarterly, Vol. 102, No. 2, 1995 (Europe's Odyssey: Old Wars, New Contests), pp. 508–9
 "Reversals", Windsor Review: A Journal of the Arts, Vol. 28, No. 1, 1995, p. 32
 "Wind-Bells Can Overcome Jealousy", Windsor Review: A Journal of the Arts, Vol. 28, No. 1, 1995, p. 33
 "Trying to Balance the Books", in The Garden of Life (National Library of Poetry, U.S.A.), Owings Mills: Watermark Press, 1995, p. 620
 "Wedding in the Garden", Malahat Review, No. 112, 1995, pp. 77–79
 "Borders", Outlook (Canadian Jewish Outlook Society), Vol. 34, No. 1, 1996, p. 25
 "Phrases of the moon", Windsor Review, Vol. 20, No. 1, 1996, p. 42
 "My mother", Windsor Review, Vol. 20, No. 1, 1996, p. 43
 "Morning words on the farm", Windsor Review, Vol. 20, No. 1, 1996, p. 44
 "Superstitions", Windsor Review, Vol. 20, No. 1, 1996, p. 45
 "Tawatinaw valley farm", Antigonish Review, No. 106, 1996, p. 114
 "The fox-fur", Antigonish Review, No. 106, 1996, pp. 115–116
 "Blessings on a tree", Parchment: Contemporary Canadian Jewish Writing, No. 5, 1996–97, pp. 39–40
 "Circumstantial evidence of the visitation of angels", Arc, No. 37, 1996, p. 37
 "One song as a cycle", Waking Ordeals, Guelph: Agram Press, 1997, p. 130
 "Symbiosis", Waking Ordeals, Guelph: Agram Press, 1997, pp. 131–132
 "The house-burning", reprinted in Directions, Vol. 3, No. 2, 1997, p. 12
 "Hopes for the Third Millennium", Spring-Fever, Your Scrivener Press/League of Canadian Poets, 1997, p. 36
 "Life as a kitchen", Waking Ordeals, No. 2, 1997
 "Vagaries of memory at mid-winter", Ariel: A Review of International English Literature, Volume 28, No. 2, 1997, pp. 115–116
 "A Defence of Prose-Poetry", Outlook (Canadian Jewish Outlook Society), Vol 34, No. 7, 1997, p. 24
 "Life as a kitchen", Parchment: Contemporary Canadian Jewish Writing, No. 6, 1998, p. 126
 "Guitar Songs: Rondels", Licking Honey Off A Thorn, 1998, p. 13
 "The psychiatry of socks", Antigonish Review, No. 112, 1998, p. 54
 "Circumstantial evidence of the visitation of angels", We All Begin in a Little Magazine: Arc and the Promise of Canada’s Poets 1978-1988, Arc Poetry Society/Carleton University Press, 1988, p. 112
 "The Threshold Stone", Ariel: A Review of International English Literature, University of Calgary, p. 129
 "How Horses Pray", Sing for the Inner Ear: The Sandberg-Livesay Award, UnMon America, 1998, p. 64
 "Describing the silence that suddenly falls on a crowded room, Fiddlehead, Summer 1998, No. 196, pp. 94-95
 "Plot for a vampirella novel: found poem", Fiddlehead, Summer 1998, No. 196, P. 95
 "The affair of an end", Like Lemmings, Summer 1998, Vol. 1, No. 1, p. 12
 "The disappearance of statues (Chania, Crete) ", Summer 1998, Like Lemmings, Vol 1, No. 1, p. 39
 "Before and after", Ariel: A Review of International English Literature, Vol. 30, No. 1, p. 104, January 1999, p. 104
 "A gathering claustrophobia: Vermeer’s Dutch interiors of the self (suite of four poems), Arachne: An Interdisciplinary Journal of the Humanities, Vol. 5, No. 2, 1998, pp. 78-80
 "Paint jobs", Parchment: Contemporary Canadian Jewish Writing, No. 8, 1999-2000 (5760), p. 160
 "Babushka in the orchard", The Antigonish Review, No. 119, Autumn 1999, p. 64
 "Underground blasting in a mining town", Like Lemmings, Vol. 2, No. 1, Winter 2000, p. 28
 "The more things change", Pottersfield Portfolio, Vol 20, No. 2 (20th Anniversary edition), p. 33
 "Breaking a plate", Arc: Canada’s National Poetry Magazine, No. 44, Summer 2000, p. 71
 "Two everyday ways of defining gravity", The Fiddlehead, No. 204, Summer 2000, p. 97
 "Farming with haiku", The Fiddlehead, No. 204, Summer 2000, p. 98
 "Snapshots of New Orleans (unsorted), Windsor Review, Vol. 32, No. 2, pp. 16-17
 "Paint-jobs", Windsor Review, Vol. 32, No. 2, p. 18
 "Hopes for the third millennium", Northern Life, 3 January 2001, p. 14
 "Absences", Convergence: Poets for Peace, a boxed set of 100 poems printed on single vellum illustrated sheets.  Peace Maker's Edition (limited to 10 numbered copies), Collector's Edition (100 copies), Peace on the Streets Edition (unlimited trade edition.  Proceeds to go to the Peace Alliance of Canada and the educational work of the League of Canadian Poets.  Fall 2000
 "The Shaking", Convergence: Poets for Peace, Fall 2000
 "Heaping dark earth", Parchment: Contemporary Canadian Jewish Writing 2001-2002, No. 10, Fall 2001, p. 113
 "In this old Jewish cemetery", Parchment: Contemporary Canadian Jewish Writing 2001-2002, No. 10, Fall 2001, pp. 113–114
 "The samovar of sunset", Parchment: Contemporary Canadian Jewish Writing 2001-2002, No. 10, Fall 2001, p. 114
 "A long line at the horizon", in Heather Spears (ed.), Line By Line: An Anthology of Canadian Poetry, Victoria: Ekstasis Editions, 2002, p. 81
 "Absences", in Susan McMaster (ed.), Waging Peace: Poetry and Political Action, Ottawa: Penumbra Press, 2002, p. 82
 "On Chagall’s ‘The Falling Angel’", in Roger Bell (ed.), Larger than Life, Windsor: Black Moss Press, 2002, p. 61
 "Note found in an insane asylum", in Roger Bell (ed.), Larger than Life, Windsor: Black Moss Press, 2002, p. 107
 "Prayer-shawls", Parchment: Contemporary Canadian Jewish Writing, No. 11, 2002–2003, pp. 177–8
 "An appointment with the beautiful lady optician", Dalhousie Review, Vol. 82, No. 2, Summer 2002, p. 301
 "Funeral Cortege", Wascana Review, 36:2, Fall 2001, p. 21
 "Doing Things Two at a Time", The Prairie Journal, No. 40, 2003, p. 34
 "High Noon", The Prairie Journal, No. 40, 2003, p. 34
 "Evening on the Farm", Grain Magazine, Vol. 31, No. 4, Spring 2004, p. 13
 "Weather Forecasts for Your Body", The Fiddlehead, No. 215, 2003, p. 50
 "Our Beduin Egg Lady (Abu Sultan, Egypt) ", Queens Quarterly, Vol 111, No. 1, Spring 2004, p. 157
 "Summer Solstice", Canadian Literature, No. 18, Spring 2004, pp. 51–54
 "Climbing to the Long-Vanished Ruins of a Taoist Monastery (Guandong Province, China), The Prairie Journal, No. 43, 2004, p. 42
 "Placing Things", The Prairie Journal, No. 43, 2004, p. 43
 "The Three Ages of Hair", Words in Edgeways (UK), Spring 2005, www.edgewaysbooks.com
 "Swimming with a Hammer-Head Shark", Words in Edgeways (UK), Spring 2005, 
 "Five Signs that You’re Not the Reincarnation of Someone Famous", Words in Edgeways (UK), Spring 2005, 
 "In Search of Continuity", Words in Edgeways (UK), Spring 2005,
 "The Sunken Kitchen", And No-one Knows the Blood We Share: Living Archives of the Feminist Caucus of the League of Canadian Poets, 2005, p. 5
 "The Village of the Blind (India)", Canadian Literature, No. 185, Summer 2005, p. 91
 "What Your Body Says", Fiddlehead No. 225, Autumn 2005 (60th Anniversary edition), p. 43
 "The Future: An Octopus Waving", Grain, Autumn 2005, p. 112
 "Plough-lines", Arc, Summer 2006, p. 89
 "Love in the kitchen", Dalhousie Review, Vol. 66 No. 2, Summer 2006, p. 291
 "Time’s optics", Queen's Quarterly, Vol 13 No. 3, Fall 2006, p. 479
 "The bicycle of love", Words in Edgeways (U.K.), Issue 18/19, Spring 2007, p. 1
 "Copse at Cookham Dean", Words in Edgeways (UK), Issue 18/19, Spring 2007, p. 2
 "Lament on a  fire-bombing", Words in Edgeways (UK), Issue 18/19, Spring 2007, pp. 2–3
 "Saving my father’s life", Words in Edgeways (UK), Issue 18/19, Spring 2007, p. 4
 "Shadows", Canadian Literature No. 192, Spring 2007, p. 44
 "The Moon and I at Lunenberg", Contemporary Verse Two 22:4, Spring 2007, p. 40
 "A Widow on Her Eighty-Third Birthday", in Katerina Fretwell (ed.), Arms Like Ladders: The Eloquent She, League of Canadian Poets, 2007, p. 76
 "Gold Burial Mask from Mycenae", Descant 38:2, Summer 2007, p. 61
 "The Last Day of the Twentieth Century", The Prairie Journal, No. 48, p. 32
 "A Fire-Festival", Canadian Literature Vol. 195, Winter 2007, p. 49		
 "The Bicycle of Love", Prairie Journal No. 50, 2008, p. 15
 "Lament on a Fire-Bombing", Prairie Journal No. 50, 2008, pp. 16–17
 "Small Sounds", Prairie Journal No. 50, 2008, p. 17
 "The Long Hokey-Cokey", Prairie Journal No. 50, 2008, pp. 18–19
 "Summer Solstice", in Canadian Literature Poets Archives, together with a short author's critical analysis, on-line at CanLit Poets (a free online poetry resource for High School – and University – students and teachers), Fall 2008
 "The Village of the Blind", in Canadian Literature Poets Archives, on-line, together with short author's critical analysis, at CanLit Poets, Fall 2008 
 "Heritage", in Canadian Literature Poets Archives, on-line, together with short author's critical analysis, at CanLit Poets, Fall 2008 
 "Shadows", in Canadian Literature Poets Archives, on-line, together with short author's critical analysis, at CanLit Poets, Fall 2008 
 "Vinnie", in Canadian Literature Poets Archives, on-line, together with short author's critical analysis, at CanLit Poets, Fall 2008 
 "This is my Mother’s Camera", in Canadian Literature Poets Archives, on-line, together with short author's critical analysis, at CanLit Poets, Fall 2008 
 "Poem of Probabilities",  in Canadian Literature Poets Archives, on-line, together with short author's critical analysis, at CanLit Poets, Fall 2008 
 "Farming on Water", in Canadian Literature Poets Archives, on-line, together with short author's critical analysis, at CanLit Poets, Fall 2008 
 "My Father’s Laugh", "Canadian Literature" issue #33 of Sugar Mule e-magazine (US), Fall 2009 
 "Turning the Tables", "Canadian Literature" issue #33 of Sugar Mule e-magazine (US), Fall 2009 
 "Constants",  "Canadian Literature" issue #33 of Sugar Mule e-magazine (US), Fall 2009 
 "Language Learning",  "Canadian Literature" issue #33 of Sugar Mule e-magazine (US), Fall 2009 
 "Indiscretions in the Garden",  "Canadian Literature" issue #33 of Sugar Mule e-magazine (US), Fall 2009 
 "Three Transformations My Wife Can Make", "Canadian Literature" issue #33 of Sugar Mule e-magazine (US), Fall 2009 
 "Your Body", Prairie Journal Issue #52, p. 6, 2009
 "Sturgeon Petroglyph", in Madhur Anand, Adam Dickinson (eds), Regreen: New Canadian Ecological Poetry, Your Scrivener Press, 2009, p. 117
 "On Getting Yourself Conceived", in Madhur Anand, Adam Dickinson (eds), Regreen: New Canadian Ecological Poetry, Your Scrivener Press, 2009, p. 118-119

Translations
 "Maxims", translated from the Anglo-Saxon, West Coast Review, Vol. 21, No. 3, 1987, p. 37 ("Maxims I", 11. 83B - 99, The Exeter Book).
 "The Ship of Death", translated from the Anglo-Saxon, Orbit, Vol. 18, No. 4, 1987, p. 19 (Beowulf, 11. 32–42).
 "The Dream of the Rood", translated from the Anglo-Saxon, Antigonish Review, Nos. 69–70, 1987, p. 201 ("The Dream of the Rood", 11. 1–12).
 "The Seafarer", translated from the Anglo-Saxon, The Antigonish Review, No. 79, 1989, p. 94 (ll. 17B-26 in The Exeter Book).
 "The Ruin", translated from the Anglo-Saxon, The Antigonish Review, No. 79, 1989, p. 95 (ll. 21-31B in The Exeter Book).
 "Caedmon's Hymn", translated from the Anglo-Saxon, The Poetry of Prayer, Brynmill Press, Norfolk, 1994, p. 55
 "The Wanderer", ll. 73–87, translated from the Anglo-Saxon (Exeter Book), Waking Ordeals, 1997, p. 71

Book reviews
 Review of T. R. Miles, Religious Experience, Dialogue Vol. 12, No.4, 1973, p. 732.
 Review of Robin Skelton, Openings, Canadian Book Review Annual, Toronto: Simon and Pierre Publishing, 1988, pp. 215–216.
 Review of Milton Acorn, Hundred Proof Earth, Canadian Book Review Annual, Toronto: Simon and Pierre Publishing, 1988, pp. 186–187.
 Review of Heather Cadsby, Decoys, Canadian Book Review Annual, Toronto: Simon and Pierre Publishing, 1989, pp. 213–214.
 Review of Richard Stevenson, Horizontal Hotel, Canadian Book Review Annual, Toronto: Simon and Pierre Publishing, 1989, p. 237.
 Review of Kenneth Sherman, Jackson's Point, Canadian Book Review Annual, Toronto: Simon and Pierre Publishing, 1989, pp. 233–234.
 Review of Barbara Carey, The Year in Pictures, Canadian Book Review Annual, Toronto: Simon and Pierre Publishing, 1989, pp. 214–215.
 Review of Joseph Sherman, Shaping the Flame: Imagining Wallenberg, Canadian Book Review Annual, Toronto: Simon and Pierre Publishing, 1989, p. 233.
 Review of Elizabeth Waterston, Ian Easterbrook, Bernard Katz and Kathleen Scott, The Travellers: Canada to 1900. An Annotated Bibliography of Works Published in English from 1577, Canadian Book Review Annual, Toronto: Simon and Pierre Publishing, 1989, p. 5.
 Review of R. J. Clark, Stepping up to the Station, Canadian Book Review Annual, Toronto: Simon and Pierre Publishing, 1990, pp. 211–212.
 Review of Jeff Derksen, Down Time, Canadian Book Review Annual, Toronto: Simon and Pierre Publishing, 1990, p. 214.
 Review of Ken Mitchell, Witches and Idiots, Canadian Book Review Annual, Toronto: Simon and Pierre Publishing, 1990, p. 226.
 Review of Glen Sorestad, Air Canada Owls: Travel Poems, Canadian Book Review Annual, Toronto: Simon and Pierre Publishing, 1990, p. 234.
 Review of Patrick O'Connell, Hoping for Angels, Canadian Book Review Annual, Toronto: Simon and Pierre Publishing, 1990, pp. 229–30.
 Review of Stephen Scobie, Remains, Canadian Book Review Annual, Toronto:  Simon and Pierre Publishing, 1990, pp. 233–234.
 Review of Richard Lush, No Solid Ground, Canadian Book Review Annual, Toronto:  Simon and Pierre Publishing, 1991, p. 212
 Review of Glen Sorestad, West into Night, Canadian Book Review Annual, Toronto:  Simon and Pierre Publishing, 1991, p. 223
 Review of Frank Davey, Popular Narratives, Canadian Book Review Annual, Toronto:  Simon and Pierre Publishing, 1991, pp. 196–97
 Review of Fred Wah, So Far, Canadian Book Review Annual, 1991, pp. 228–29
 Review of Dennis Cooley, This Only Home, Canadian Book Review Annual, Toronto: Simon and Pierre Publishing, 1992, pp. 201–202
 Review of Vic Elias, Reflected Scenery from Where My Eyes Should Be, Canadian Book Review Annual, Toronto: Simon and Pierre Publishing, 1992, p. 205
 Review of Michael Harris, New and Selected Poems, Canadian Book Review Annual, Toronto: Simon and Pierre Publishing, 1992, p. 209
 Review of Raymond Souster, Riding the Long Black Horse, Canadian Book Review Annual, Toronto: Simon and Pierre Publishing, 1993, p. 3232
 Review of Richard Outram, Mogul Recollected, Canadian Book Review Annual, Toronto: Simon and Pierre Publishing, 1993, p. 3212
 Review of Seymour Mayne, Killing Time, Canadian Book Review Annual, Toronto: Simon and Pierre Publishing, 1993, pp. 3197 – 3198
 Review of Dan Jalowica, Port Ebony, Canadian Book Review Annual, Toronto: Simon and Pierre Publishing, 1993, pp. 3185 – 3186
 Review of Wayne Keon, Storm Dancer, Canadian Book Review Annual, Toronto: Simon and Pierre Publishing, 1993, p. 3186
 Review of Brian Brett, Poems, New and Selected, Canadian Book Review Annual, Toronto: Simon and Pierre Publishing, 1994, pp. 200–201
 Review of Anne Campbell, Angel Wings All Over, Canadian Book Review Annual, Toronto: Simon and Pierre Publishing, 1994, p. 202
 Review of Victor Coleman, Lapsed WASP: Poems 1978–89, Canadian Book Review Annual, Toronto: Simon and Pierre Publishing, 1994, p. 204
 Review of Michael Holmes, James I Wanted to Ask You, Canadian Book Review Annual, Toronto: Simon and Pierre Publishing, 1994, p. 209
 Review of David Lawson, Zhongguo, Canadian Book Review Annual, Toronto: Simon and Pierre Publishing, 1994, p. 211
 Review of John Pass, Radical Innocence, Canadian Book Review Annual, Toronto: Simon and Pierre Publishing, 1994, p. 217
 Review of James Deahl, Under the Watchful Eye: Poetry and Discourse, in Canadian Book Review Annual, Toronto: Simon and Pierre Publishing, 1995, p. 209
 Review of Douglas Fetherling, Selected Poems, in Canadian Book Review Annual, Toronto: Simon and Piere Publishing, 1995, p. 211
 Review of Cherie Geauvreau, Even the Fawn has Wings, in Canadian Book Review Annual, Toronto: Simon and Pierre Publishing, 1995, p. 213
 Review of Richard Greene, Republic of Solitude: Poems 1984–1994, in Canadian Book Review Annual, Toronto: Simon and Pierre Publishing, 1995, p. 214
 Review of Tom Marshall, Some Impossible Heaven, in Canadian Book Review Annual, Toronto: Simon and Pierre Publishing, 1995, pp. 221–222
 Review of David McFadden, There'll Be Another, in Canadian Book Review Annual, Toronto: ........Simon and Pierre Publishing, 1995, p. 223
 Review of Elizabeth St Jacques, Around the Tree of Light: A Collection of Korean Sijo and Dance of Light, in Canadian Book Review Annual, Toronto:  Simon and Pierre Publishing, 1995, p. 231
 Review of Kwame Dawes, Resisting the Anomie, in Canadian Book Review Annual, Toronto: Simon and Pierre Publishing, 1996, p. 199
 Review of Paulette Jiles, Flying Lessons: Selected Poems, in Canadian Book Review Annual, Toronto: Simon and Pierre Publishing, 1996, pp. 204–205
 Review of Kenn Johnson, Loon Echo, in Canadian Book Review Annual, Toronto: Simon and Pierre Publishing, 1996, p. 205
 Review of Pamela Mordecai, De Man: A Performance Poem, in Canadian Book Review Annual, Toronto: Simon and Pierre Publishing, 1996, p. 208
 Review of Fraser Sutherland, Jonestown, in Canadian Book Review Annual, Toronto: Simon and Pierre Publishing, 1996, p. 216
 Review of Bruce Whiteman, Visible Stars: New and Selected Poems, in Canadian Book Review Annual, Toronto: Simon and Pierre Publishing, 1996, p. 220

External links 
 CanLit Interview with Roger Nash
 League of Canadian Poets page on Roger Nash

1946 births
20th-century Canadian poets
Canadian male poets
Alumni of the University of Wales
McMaster University alumni
Alumni of the University of Exeter
Living people
Academic staff of Laurentian University
Writers from Greater Sudbury
People from Maidenhead
Jewish Canadian writers
20th-century Canadian male writers
Poets Laureate of places in Canada